Chaetothyriothecium is a genus of fungi in the family Microthyriaceae.

References 

 Introducing Chaetothyriothecium, a new genus of Microthyriales. Sinang Hongsanan, Putarak Chomnunti, Pedro W. Crous, Ekachai Chukeatirote and Kevin D. Hyde, 2014, Phytotaxa, volume 161 (2), pages 157–164,

External links 

 
 Chaetothyriothecium at Mycobank

Dothideomycetes genera
Microthyriales